Kürdşaban (also, Kürşaban and Kyurdshaban) is a village and municipality in the Goychay Rayon of Azerbaijan.  It has a population of 1,051. The municipality consists of the villages of Kürdşaban and Yenikənd.

References 

Populated places in Goychay District